Citycon Oyj owns, develops, and manages shopping centers and other retail properties in Finland, Norway, Sweden, Lithuania, Estonia, and Denmark. The company primarily rents its properties to retailers. Citycon owns more than 50 shopping centres and 2 other retail properties. Of the shopping centres, 19 are located in Finland, 19 in Norway, 9 in Sweden, including Kista Galleria, 2 in Estonia, 1 in Denmark and 1 in Lithuania (Mandarinas). In addition, Citycon leases and manages 13 shopping centres in Norway on behalf of other owners. Citycon’s shopping centres attract approximately 200 million visitors annually.

History
Citycon was founded in 1988 by the Insurance Company Sampo Pension Ltd, Imatran Voima Oy, Rakennustoimisto A. Puolimatka Oy and Postipankki. The company listed on the Main List of the Helsinki Exchanges.

References

Companies listed on Nasdaq Helsinki
Retail companies of Finland